Kinwamayu (Quechua kinwa a plant (Chenopodium quinoa), mayu river, Hispanicized spelling Ccuenhuamayo) is a river in Peru located in the  Ayacucho Region, Victor Fajardo Province, Huancapi District. It is an affluent of the Pampas River.

Kinwamayu originates in the Canaria District. Here it is named Saqsara (Saccsara). It flows in a mainly northern direction following the border with the Huaya District. In the Huancapi District it flows along the villages Wisk'achayuq (Viscachayoj), Tuturaqucha (Totoraqocha), Aqu Punku (Acco Punco) and Qucha (Ccocha) until reaching the town Huancapi. Now it changes its name to Huancapi. Its direction is mainly to the north. The confluence of the rivers Kinwamayu and Pampas is north of the village Aya Urqu (Ayaorcco).

There is a village named Kinwamayu (Ccenhuamayo) east of the river in the Huaya District.

See also 
 Ñawpallaqta
 Willkamayu

References

Rivers of Peru
Rivers of Ayacucho Region